Alan Baró Calabuig (born 22 June 1985) is a Spanish footballer who plays for CF Peralada mainly as a central defender but also as a defensive midfielder.

He amassed Segunda División totals of 177 matches and two goals over six seasons, mainly at the service of Ponferradina (four years). He appeared once in La Liga with Osasuna, and also competed professionally in Australia.

Club career

First years
Born in Darnius, Girona, Catalonia, Baró began his career with local clubs CF Peralada and UE Figueres, suffering relegation from Segunda División B with the latter at the end of 2006–07. On 6 July 2007, he moved to fellow league side Alicante CF, playing 39 official games in his first season as the Valencians earned promotion and a further 26 in the second as they were relegated.

Osasuna
In the summer of 2009, Baró moved to La Liga with CA Osasuna, initially being registered to their reserves in the third division. On 26 October, he was called up by manager José Antonio Camacho for a Copa del Rey match against Xerez CD, but eventually did not feature in the 2–1 away win. The following 24 January, away to the same opponents (same venue and score), he played the final minute in place of Javier Camuñas without touching the ball, handing him the record of the shortest career for the Navarrese club.

Albacete
On 8 July 2010, Baró returned to Segunda División, signing a two-year deal at Albacete Balompié. He stayed for only one season at the Estadio Carlos Belmonte – ending in relegation – being sent off in the 26th minute of a 4–2 loss at Xerez on 23 April 2011.

Ponferradina
Subsequently, Baró moved to another team in the third tier, SD Ponferradina, totalling 44 appearances in his debut campaign as they won promotion via the play-offs. He was always first choice during his spell at the Estadio El Toralín, mainly as a stopper, scoring his first goal on 9 December 2012 in a 3–1 home victory over CD Mirandés.

Baró started in 34 of his 35 appearances in 2015–16, but the club was relegated from the second division after a four-year stay.

Australia
On 7 July 2016, Baró joined Melbourne Victory FC as a replacement for the retired Matthieu Delpierre. He was released on 12 May 2017, moving to fellow A-League side Central Coast Mariners FC late in that month.

On 23 September 2017, Baró was announced as the latter's captain. In June of the following year, the 33-year-old mutually terminated his contract despite having a year left on it.

Notes

References

External links

1985 births
Living people
People from Alt Empordà
Sportspeople from the Province of Girona
Spanish footballers
Footballers from Catalonia
Association football defenders
Association football midfielders
Association football utility players
La Liga players
Segunda División players
Segunda División B players
Tercera Federación players
CF Peralada players
UE Figueres footballers
Alicante CF footballers
CA Osasuna B players
CA Osasuna players
Albacete Balompié players
SD Ponferradina players
UE Olot players
A-League Men players
Melbourne Victory FC players
Central Coast Mariners FC players
Spanish expatriate footballers
Expatriate soccer players in Australia
Spanish expatriate sportspeople in Australia